Zheng Jianbang (born January 1957) is a Chinese politician, who is currently a vice chairperson of the Standing Committee of the National People's Congress, and the chairperson of the Revolutionary Committee of the Chinese Kuomintang (RCCK). Between 2018 and 2023, he served as a vice chairperson of the Chinese People's Political Consultative Conference.

References

External links 

1957 births
Living people
People from Shimen County
Northeast Normal University alumni
Members of the Revolutionary Committee of the Chinese Kuomintang
Delegates to the 9th National People's Congress
Delegates to the 10th National People's Congress
Members of the Standing Committee of the 11th Chinese People's Political Consultative Conference
Members of the Standing Committee of the 12th Chinese People's Political Consultative Conference
Vice Chairpersons of the National Committee of the Chinese People's Political Consultative Conference